Interferon alpha-6 is a protein that in humans is encoded by the IFNA6 gene.

References

Further reading